The 2023 CAFA Women's Futsal Championship was the second edition of CAFA Women's Futsal Championship, the annual international futsal championship organized by CAFA for the women's national futsal teams of Central Asia. the tournament was hosted in Tashkent, Uzbekistan.

Iran were the defending champion having won the 2022 inaugural edition, and they successfully defended their title finishing unbeaten, after beating hosts Uzbekistan in an exciting final day.

Participating nations
A total of 4 (out of 6) CAFA member national teams entered the tournament.

Did not enter

Squads

Match officials
A total of eight referees from the four participating associations were appointed for the tournament.

Referees

 Zahra Rahimi
 Somayeh Taheri
 Nurbek Arstanbek Uulu
 Talantbek Raimberdiev
 Safarali Mahmadizoda
 Behzur Murtazoev
 Aleksandra Konchikova
 Gulshoda Saitkulova

Main Tournament
Times are UZT (UTC+5).

Tournament table

Goalscorers

Player awards

The following awards were given at the conclusion of the tournament:

See also
2022 CAFA Women's Futsal Championship

References

CAFA Women's Futsal Championship
2023 in Asian futsal
CAFA